Born to be Wired was a professional wrestling live event produced by Extreme Championship Wrestling (ECW) on August 9, 1997. The event was held in the ECW Arena in Philadelphia, Pennsylvania in the United States. Excerpts from Born to be Wired aired on episodes #225 and #226 of the syndicated television program ECW Hardcore TV on August 15 and August 22, 1997, while the full event was released on VHS in 1997 and on DVD in 2002. The main event was also included in the 2005 compilation DVD BloodSport - The Most Violent Matches of ECW.

Born to be Wired is best known for its main event: a barbed wire match for the ECW World Heavyweight Championship between Sabu and Terry Funk.

Event 

The commentator for Born to be Wired was Joey Styles. The ring announcer was Bob Artese.

The opening bout was a singles match between Little Guido and Pablo Márquez. Little Guido won the match by pinfall after hitting Márquez with the Italian flag.

The second bout was a singles match between Louie Spicolli and Mikey Whipwreck, with Whipwreck winning by pinfall using a FrankenMikey.

The third bout was a singles match between Bam Bam Bigelow and Spike Dudley. The much larger Bigelow dominated the match with power moves until Dudley accidentally gave Bigelow a low blow, then delivered a victory roll for an upset pinfall victory. Following his victory, Dudley was dubbed "the Giant Killer".

The fourth bout was a singles match between Chris Candido and Chris Chetti. Candido won the bout by pinfall following a super double underhook suplex.

The fifth bout was a singles match between Lance Storm and Shane Douglas. Douglas won the bout by pinfall following a belly-to-belly suplex.

The sixth bout saw ECW World Television Champion Taz defend the title against Al Snow. Taz won the bout by submission after applying the Tazmission.

The seventh bout was a six-man tag team match pitting The Dudley Brothers against Axl Rotten, Balls Mahoney, and Hack Meyers. The bout began as a tag team match between The Dudley Boyz and Rotten and Mahoney, but following repeated interference by Big Dick Dudley, Rotten and Mahoney brought Meyers to the ring to even the numbers, eventually resulting in the match being declared a six-man tag team match. The match ended when the Dudley Boyz delivered the 3D to Meyers and then pinned him.

The penultimate match was a singles bout between Rob Van Dam and Tommy Dreamer, with Van Dam representing the faction of World Wrestling Federation-aligned wrestlers who were "invading" ECW. Following interference from Van Dam's tag team partner Sabu, Van Dam defeated Dreamer by pinfall after giving him a corkscrew leg drop onto a trash can. Following the match, a large brawl broke out featuring many members of the roster.

The main event saw ECW World Heavyweight Champion Terry Funk defend his championship against Sabu in a barbed wire match. Early in the match, both men repeatedly collided with the barbed wire, causing them to bleed. After Sabu severely tore his bicep open on the barbed wire, he temporarily closed the wound using surgical tape and continue to wrestle. Towards the end of the match, Rob Van Dam interfered on Sabu's behalf until being driven away by Tommy Dreamer. The match ended with both men badly tangled in barbed wire, after which Sabu wrapped barbed wire around his leg and then delivered a leg drop to Funk before pinning him to win the ECW World Heavyweight Championship. Following the match, the two men were so entangled in wire that Sabu's manager Bill Alfonso and the ring crew had to use wire cutters to free them. Sabu's arm required over 100 stitches to close the wound.

Reaction 

The main event of Born to be Wired was recognized for its brutality. In 2012, World Wrestling Entertainment named the main event one of ECW's "25 most must-see matches". Due to the intensity of the match, ECW promoter Paul Heyman opted never to book another barbed wire match.

Results

References

External links 
 

1997 in Pennsylvania
1997 in professional wrestling
Extreme Championship Wrestling supercards and pay-per-view events
Events in Philadelphia
August 1997 events in the United States
Professional wrestling in Philadelphia